The Bahamas International Film Festival (BIFF) is a non-profit film festival held in the Bahamas. Open to both locals and international visitors, the festival was founded by Leslie Vanderpool in 2004.

BIFF also hosts a youth film workshop that aims to provide young Bahamians with information and resources on filmmaking.

The 2015 BIFF showcased several women-driven films such as Carol and Janis: Little Girl Blue.

BIFF was listed among the 25 coolest film festivals in the world by MovieMaker Magazine.

Awards
The following is a list of awards given at the Bahamas International Film Festival.

Grand Jury

Audience awards

First Look

Honors

Bahamian Tribute Award
 2009: Gavin McKinney

Career Achievement Award
 2005: Spike Lee
 2006: Nicolas Cage
 2007: Daryl Hannah
 2008: Laurence Fishburne
 2011: Heather Graham
 2013: Danny Glover
 2017: Grace Jones

Rising Star Honoree
 2007: Naomie Harris
 2008: Anna Faris
 2009: Sophie Okonedo
 2011: Zoë Kravitz

Shining Star Tribute
 2012: Sydney Tamiia Poitier
 2014: Debra Messing
 2017: Michael K. Williams

Sir Sidney Poitier Tribute Award
 2016: Cicely Tyson

Tribute Award
 2014: Chaz Ebert

References

External links

Film festivals in the Caribbean
Cinema of the Bahamas
2003 establishments in the Bahamas
Film festivals established in 2003
Arts festivals in the Bahamas